The Winchester School is a British private school situated in the Jebel Ali area of Dubai in the United Arab Emirates.

The Winchester School is a registered international school from FS-1 (age 3–4) to Year 13 (age 18) and has over 3,800 enrolled. It was founded in 2003. The school is part of GEMS, an international school business.

The school is located on the southwest edge of The Gardens neighbourhood and close to Jebel Ali Village. It is close to the Dubai branch of the Delhi Private School.

In 2019, a teacher at the school, Shalini Rajan, was BTEC Teacher of the Year, quoted to be "empowering her students by embracing modern teaching and learning strategies".

The school is regularly mentioned in national UAE newspapers. For example, in 2016, the school was reported by Gulf News to be the best UAE school for girls' cricket. In 2019, it was reported that the Winchester School raised over Dh130,000 to support education programmes for children in Malawi. The GCSE results in 2020 were reported as being 72% at grades 5–9, with one pupil achieving nine A* results (grades 8–9).

References

External links
 The Winchester School website
 

2003 establishments in the United Arab Emirates
Educational institutions established in 2003
Private schools in the United Arab Emirates
British international schools in Dubai
GEMS schools